The Snow Leopard Conservancy (SLC) was founded in 2000 by Dr Rodney Jackson, a leading expert on snow leopards (Panthera uncia) and their habitat. The conservancy works to engage and incorporate local communities in protecting snow leopards in Pakistan, Nepal, Tajikistan, Mongolia, Russia and India. SLC is a non-profit organization with headquarter in Sonoma, California.

Programs
The Snow Leopard Conservancy works with local people to not only find a way for them to live harmoniously with snow leopards but also to become their guardians. SLC has done this by creating alternative-income projects, such as tourist homestay lodging and eco-tourism. Other means of working with local herding populations is to protect livestock by building predator-proof corrals and providing conservation education and training for children in the Himalayan region.

SLC also conducts research to better understand the behaviors and habitat needs of snow leopards. This is done using remote camera traps, fecal DNA sampling and GPS-satellite collars to study movements and corridor analysis to find areas to target for conservation efforts.

See also

 Wildlife Conservation Network
 Conservation movement
 Environmental movement
 Natural environment
 Sustainability

References

External links

Wildlife Conservation Network website

Cat conservation organizations
Conservation projects
Organizations established in 2000
International environmental organizations
Environmental organizations based in California
Wildlife conservation in India